Chebika (الشبيكة) is a mountain oasis in western Tunisia, in Tozeur Governorate.

Geography
Chebika lies at the foot of the mountains of the Djebel el Negueb and, because of its exposure to the sun, it is known as قصر الشمس Qasr el-Shams ("Palace of the Sun" in Arabic).

History
In antiquity, it was a Roman outpost known as Ad Speculum and later a mountain refuge of the Berber people. Ad Speculum was civitas of the Roman Province of Africa between 30 BC and 640 AD. Located on the Saharan limes just north of Ad Turres, it was a station on the road linking Tébessa and Gafsa.

The modern village of Chebika has several hundred residents. It was built near the old town, which was abandoned in 1969 after catastrophic flooding in which more than 400 people died. The site, writes Jean Duvignaud, "is located at the intersection of two projections of the mountain which opens here towards the desert". The urban framework consists of a grid plan intersecting at the market place.

Many scenes for the film The English Patient were shot in the Chebika oasis landscape.

References

External links

Populated places in Tozeur Governorate
Communes of Tunisia
Oases of Tunisia